Several ships of the French Navy have borne the name Saint Louis:

 , 64-gun second rank two-decker ship of the line
 , 90-gun Suffren class ship of the line
 Saint Louis, a  pre-dreadnought battleship

French Navy ship names